Lindsay Davenport and Mary Joe Fernández were scheduled to play Tracy Austin and Gigi Fernández in the previous year's final. However, the match was canceled on 12 September due to rain and was not rescheduled.

Davenport and Fernández won the title this year, defeating Martina Navratilova and Arantxa Sánchez Vicario in the final, 6–4, 6–2.

Draw

Finals

External links 
 Women's Champions Doubles Draw

Women's Champions Invatiational